The 2015–16 SL Favorit Sport was the 1st season of the newly established Ukrainian top-tier basketball competition, the Ukrainian SL Favorit Sport. The season started on October 10, 2015.

Separation
At the start of the 2015–16 season, the SL Favorit Sport league was founded, and several teams from the Ukrainian SuperLeague, including the league's champions, Khimik, left the Ukrainian SuperLeague and joined the newly formed Ukrainian SL Favorit Sport league.

Teams

Regular season

Playoffs

References

2015–16
1
Ukraine